Diplangidae is a family of trematodes belonging to the order Plagiorchiida.

Genera:
 Diplangus Linton, 1910
 Pseudodiplangus Yamaguti, 1971

References

Plagiorchiida